Pleasance may refer to:

People
 Pleasance Pendred (1864–1948), British women's rights activist and suffragette
 Pleasance Smith (1773–1877), English letter writer, literary editor and centenarian
 Richard Pleasance, Australian rock musician and record producer
 Simon Pleasance (born 1944), Anglo-French art translator and writer

Other uses
 The Pleasance (street), a street just outside the Old Town of Edinburgh, Scotland
 The Pleasance, a theatre, bar, sports and recreation complex on the street
 Pleasance Theatre Trust, often simply called The Pleasance, a Scottish venue operator and producer of live events
 Pleasance B.C., a basketball club based in Edinburgh
 Pleasance Islington, also known as the Pleasance Theatre, a fringe theatre in Islington, London

See also
 Emslie Horniman's Pleasance, a park in the Borough of Kensington and Chelsea in London
 Pleasence, a surname

English-language feminine given names